St. Joseph's High School located at Briand Square in Bengaluru, Karnataka, India, is run under the aegis of the Catholic Archdiocese of Bangalore.

History
St. Joseph's Church was built in memory of Fr Briand. It is one of the oldest church in Bangalore. The stone was laid in 1852 at Briand Square on Mysore Road on the Bangalore-Mysore National highway. It is the only church in Bangalore with a crypt. The church was completed in 1867 and the area around the church was also called Briand Square. In 1867 a primary school was completed adjacent to the church, in 1945 a middle school was built and progressed to have a high school in 1962. The school buildings are situated in the heart of the garden city.

The school is affiliated to the S. S. L. C. Board, and is recognised by the Government of Karnataka. There is both English and Kannada medium of instruction up to middle school.  High school is taught in English medium. Sanskrit is also taught as subsidiary language. Admission to the School is made on the basis of an entrance examination, strictly on the basis of merit.

Facilities 
Science lab: The institution has well-equipped and maintained laboratories pertaining to the distinct branches of science. The labs have all the requisite material and aim at promoting a deeper understanding of the subject
Library: The School has a spacious and well-stocked library, which houses books on a wide variety of topics. Students are encouraged to supplement their classroom knowledge through books available from the library
Sports club: Large, open playgrounds accommodate sports such as cricket, football, basketball, volleyball, hockey and other games and forms of exercise.

Activities 
NCC - The School has a Naval wing of the National Cadet Corps.
There are literary activities in both English and Kannada. Students are trained in public speaking and the art of writing. 
Students are encouraged to take part in various competitions held or sponsored by the School.
The School also has a brass-brand, Science Club, YSM and YCM. Students are encouraged to take part in these activities
Inter-House activities and competitions are conducted regularly during the activity periods.

Examinations 
The School conducts six tests and two examinations during the course of the academic year. Promotion to higher classes is based on the performance of the student in all the tests and terminal exams. The School follows a system of continuous evaluation.

The Houses 
The House system is a feature common to Public Schools in India, especially Christian-run schools (based on a similar system in England). It helps to conduct School activities in an organised manner and inculcate qualities of leadership and responsibility among the students.

The four houses are named after the patron saints of the four constituent nations of the United Kingdom: 
 St. Andrew of Scotland - colour blue
 St. Patrick of Northern Ireland -colour green
 St. George of England - colour red
 St. David of Wales - colour yellow.

The houses compete with one another in academics, games, track and field sports, aquatics, arts, and literary, dramatic, and music competitions.

School motto  and Vision
The motto of the school is "Wisdom and Virtue".
The School aims at developing various facets of the student's personality by providing a conducive environment that leads to wholesome unfolding of the pupil's potentials.

See also 
 Places of worship in Bangalore

References 

Boys' schools in India
High schools and secondary schools in Bangalore